Boeing has designed and built several hydrofoil craft for both military and civilian use.

Passenger hydrofoil
Boeing 929 - A passenger-carrying water jet-propelled hydrofoil.

Military hydrofoils

PCH (Submarine Chaser Hydrofoil)

PGH (Patrol Gunboat Hydrofoil)
 (built by Boeing; predecessor to Boeing's commercial JetFoils)

PHM (Patrol Hydrofoil Missile)
Pegasus class hydrofoils
, formerly Delphinus

See also

References